5148 Giordano, provisional designation , is a background asteroid from the outer regions of the asteroid belt, approximately  in diameter. It was discovered on 17 October 1960, by Dutch astronomer couple Ingrid and Cornelis van Houten on photographic plates taken by Dutch–American astronomer Tom Gehrels at the Palomar Observatory in California, United States. It was named for Italian friar and heretic Giordano Bruno, who was burned at the stake in Rome in 1600. The presumably carbonaceous Themistian asteroid has a rotation period of 7.8 hours and possibly an elongated shape.

Orbit and classification 

Giordano is a non-family asteroid of the main belt's background population when applying the hierarchical clustering method to its proper orbital elements. Based on osculating Keplerian orbital elements, the asteroid has also been classified as a Themistian asteroid that belongs to the Themis family, a very large family of carbonaceous asteroids, named after 24 Themis.

It orbits the Sun in the outer asteroid belt at a distance of 2.7–3.6 AU once every 5 years and 6 months (2,008 days; semi-major axis of 3.11 AU). Its orbit has an eccentricity of 0.15 and an inclination of 1° with respect to the ecliptic. The body's observation arc begins at Palomar on 24 September 1960, less than a month prior to its official discovery observation.

Physical characteristics 

Giordano is an assumed carbonaceous C-type asteroid derived from the overall spectral type for Themistian asteroids.

Rotation period 

In September 2010, a rotational lightcurve of Giordano was obtained from photometric observations in the R-band by astronomers at the Palomar Transient Factory in California. Lightcurve analysis gave a rotation period of 7.824 hours with a brightness amplitude of 0.60 magnitude, indicative for an elongated shape.

Diameter and albedo 

According to the survey carried out by the NEOWISE mission of NASA's Wide-field Infrared Survey Explorer, Giordano measures 8.112 and 8.5 kilometers in diameter and its surface has an albedo of 0.089 and 0.07, respectively. The Collaborative Asteroid Lightcurve Link assumes an albedo of 0.08 and calculates a diameter of 6.06 kilometers based on an absolute magnitude of 14.45.

Palomar–Leiden survey 

The survey designation "P-L" stands for Palomar–Leiden, named after Palomar Observatory and Leiden Observatory, which collaborated on the fruitful Palomar–Leiden survey in the 1960s. Gehrels used Palomar's Samuel Oschin telescope (also known as the 48-inch Schmidt Telescope), and shipped the photographic plates to Ingrid and Cornelis van Houten at Leiden Observatory where astrometry was carried out. The trio are credited with the discovery of several thousand asteroid discoveries.

Naming 

This minor planet was named after an Italian Dominican friar Giordano Bruno (1548–1600), a philosopher, mathematician, poet, and cosmological theorist who spent many years in London, where several of his papers were published.

Bruno was convinced that the Copernican heliocentric rather than the Geocentric model was correct, and proposed that other worlds, on which people could live, might exist around other stars. This brought him in conflict with the church. He was found guilty of heresy by the Roman Inquisition and was burned at the stake in Rome in 1600. The official naming citation was published by the Minor Planet Center on 1 September 1993. The asteroid's number, 5148, is a permutation of his birth year (1548). The lunar crater Giordano Bruno was also named in his honor. Another asteroid, 13223 Cenaceneri, was named after Bruno's work "The Dinner of the Ashes", where he discusses the possibility of an infinite number of worlds in the universe.

References

External links 
 Asteroid Lightcurve Database (LCDB), query form (info )
 Dictionary of Minor Planet Names, Google books
 Asteroids and comets rotation curves, CdR – Observatoire de Genève, Raoul Behrend
 Discovery Circumstances: Numbered Minor Planets (5001)-(10000) – Minor Planet Center
 
 

005148
Discoveries by Cornelis Johannes van Houten
Discoveries by Ingrid van Houten-Groeneveld
Discoveries by Tom Gehrels
5557
Named minor planets
5148 Giordano
19601017